Melta Point (Nos Melta \'nos 'mel-ta\) is a rocky point on the coast of Hero Bay, Livingston Island, formed by an offshoot of Teres Ridge.  Adjacent ice-free area .  The point is named after the ancient Melta, ancestor of the present town of Lovech in Northern Bulgaria. This is one of the Bulgarian names bestowed on hitherto nameless geographical features by the Tangra 2004/05 Expedition.

Location

Maps
 L.L. Ivanov et al. Antarctica: Livingston Island and Greenwich Island, South Shetland Islands. Scale 1:100000 topographic map. Sofia: Antarctic Place-names Commission of Bulgaria, 2005.
 L.L. Ivanov. Antarctica: Livingston Island and Greenwich, Robert, Snow and Smith Islands. Scale 1:120000 topographic map. Troyan: Manfred Wörner Foundation, 2010.  (First edition 2009. )
 Antarctic Digital Database (ADD). Scale 1:250000 topographic map of Antarctica. Scientific Committee on Antarctic Research (SCAR). Since 1993, regularly updated.
 L.L. Ivanov. Antarctica: Livingston Island and Smith Island. Scale 1:100000 topographic map. Manfred Wörner Foundation, 2017.

Notes

References
 Melta Point. SCAR Composite Gazetteer of Antarctica.
 Bulgarian Antarctic Gazetteer. Antarctic Place-names Commission. (details in Bulgarian, basic data in English)

External links
 Melta Point. Copernix satellite image

Headlands of Livingston Island